Chuan Hung-ping (born 15 April 1978) is a Taiwanese diver. He competed in the men's 10 metre platform event at the 1996 Summer Olympics.

References

1978 births
Living people
Taiwanese male divers
Olympic divers of Taiwan
Divers at the 1996 Summer Olympics
Place of birth missing (living people)